Boca do Acre (Mouth of Acre) is a municipality located in the Brazilian state of Amazonas. Its population was 34,635 (2020) and its area is 22,349 km².

The municipality holds 92% of the  Mapiá-Inauini National Forest, created in 1989.
It also contains the  Arapixi Extractive Reserve, created in 2006.

References

Municipalities in Amazonas (Brazilian state)